Paskalis Bruno Syukur O.F.M. (born 17 May 1962) is an Indonesian Roman Catholic bishop.

Ordained to the priesthood on 2 February 1991, Paskalis was named bishop of the Roman Catholic Diocese of Bogor, Indonesia on 21 November 2013 and ordained on 22 February 2014.

Biography
Paskalis was born on 17 May 1962, and attended church in the Diocese of Ruteng in his youth. He studied at St. Pius XII Middle Seminary in Kisol, then in 1981 he took his vows as a Franciscan friar as part of the order of Hina Dina in Yogyakarta in 1981.

He was ordained to the priesthood in February 1991. He spent the next two years from 1991 to 1993 working in the Diocese of Jayapura. From 1993 to 1996 he studied at the Pontifical University Antonianum, where after graduating he was appointed the master of Franciscan friars in Depok, a position he held from 1996 to 2001. He was then provincial minister for the Franciscans throughout Indonesia from 2001 to 2010, and has also been an OFM advisory council member for the Franciscan ecclesiastical province of Asia and Oceania since 2009.

References

External links

1962 births
Living people
People from Manggarai Regency
Franciscan bishops
21st-century Roman Catholic bishops in Indonesia
Indonesian Friars Minor